Actinospica is a genus in the phylum Actinomycetota (Bacteria).

Etymology
The name Actinospica derives from:Greek noun , a beam (=an actinomycete-like bacterium); Latin feminine gender noun spica, tuft; New Latin feminine gender noun Actinospica, an actinomycete with tufts of aerial hyphae.

Species
The genus contains 2 species (including basonyms and synonyms), namely
 A. acidiphila Cavaletti et al. 2006 (New Latin noun acidum (from Latin adjective acidus, sour), an acid; New Latin adjective philus from Greek adjective philos (φίλος) meaning friend, loving; New Latin feminine gender adjective acidiphila, acid-loving.)
 A. robiniae Cavaletti et al. 2006 (Type species of the genus).; New Latin feminine gender noun Robinia, a genus of tree (as it was isolated from Robinia pseudoacacia); New Latin feminine gender genitive case noun robiniae, of Robinia

See also
 Bacterial taxonomy
 Microbiology

References 

Bacteria genera
Actinomycetia